Alex Pella (born 2 November 1972) is a Spanish yachtsman. In 2014 he became the first and only Spanish to win a transoceanic single-handed race, the Route du Rhum. Alex Pella made history once again, on the 26th of January 2017, when he broke, with the rest of the team, the absolute round-the-world speed sailing record, known as the Jules Verne Trophy., aboard the sophisticated maxi-multihull IDEC 3. They circumnavigated the planet in 40 days, 23 hours, 30 minutes and 30 seconds.

Early life
Alex was born in Barcelona on 2 November 1972, within a nautical environment and a sailing family. Second of four brothers, who have all made boats and sailing their profession, he began to sail as a very young boy aboard his family’s yacht. To date, Alex has sailed on all kinds of racing boats, from the light Mini Transat 6.50 to the most sophisticated Maxi-Trimarans.

Alex has been a professional sailor for over 15 years, in which he has completed more than 150.000 nautical miles. He discovered his passion for offshore single-handed sailing at the end of the 1990s while preparing two Spanish boats for the Solitaire du Figaro.

In his first internationally renowned race -the Mini Transat 6.50 - Alex Pella obtained the best classifications in history for a non-French skipper. He was third in 2003 and second in 2005, winning the long leg from the Canary Islands to Brazil.

He thus became the first and only Spanish to win a leg in a transoceanic solo race.

Other accomplishments
On 19 November 2014, Alex Pella wins the Route du Rhum aboard the "Tales II" and becomes the first and only Spanish to win a transoceanic single-handed regatta.

Alex Pella wrote himself into the history books of the Route du Rhum solo Transatlantic race and Spanish ocean racing when he crossed the finish line of the 3542 miles La Route du Rhum-Destination Guadeloupe race first in Class40 at 06:47:08 hrs TU/07:47:08hrs CET/02:47:08 Local Gaudeloupe.

He sets a new course record of 16d17h47m8s, beating the 2010 mark for the 40 foot Class 17d 23h 10m by 1d 5h 23m 09s.

After starting off Saint Malo on his 42nd birthday, Sunday 2 November, the Spanish sailor took 16d17h47m8s to complete the 3542 miles course, at a theoretical average speed of 8.82kts. In reality he sailed 4336 miles at an average speed of 10.79kts.

Sporting career
2021:
1st RORC Transatlantic Race, aboard the Multi50 "Rayon Vert"
 Ultim 32/23 Circuit
Classic Yachts Circuit, aboard the S&S Sparkman & Stephens "Galvana" of The Pella Brothers

2020:
3rd RORC Caribbean 600 – Swan Challenges Series, aboard the Swan65 S&S Sparkman & Stephens "Libelula"
 Ultim 32/23 Circuit

2019:
3rd Brest Atlantiques, aboard the Ultim "Actual Leader" with Yves Le Blevec
 Ultim 32/23 Circuit (Armen Race, Fastnet Race...etc.) 
3rd Défi Atlantique, aboard the Class 40 "Made in Midi" with Kito de Pavant
2nd Panerai Transat Classique, aboard the Yawl Olin Stephens "Stiren"

2018:
Record Hong Kong - London, Tea Route, in 36 days, 2 hours, 37 minutes and 12 seconds, aboard the MOD70 Maserati
3rd Swan Cup, aboard the Swan65 S&S Sparkman & Stephens "Libelula"
Classic Yachts Circuit, aboard the S&S Sparkman & Stephens "Galvana" of The Pella Brothers

2017:
1st Transat Jacques Vabre, Multi50 aboard the Arkema in 10 days, 19 hours, 14 minutes and 19 seconds
Jules Verne Trophy, absolute round-the-world speed sailing record, aboard the IDEC 3. Fastest circumnavigation of the world in 40 days, 23 hours, 30 minutes and 30 seconds
2nd The Bridge, aboard the IDEC 3
South Indian Ocean Record in 5 days, 21 hours, 7 minutes and 45 seconds, aboard the IDEC 3
South Pacific Ocean Record in 7 days, 21 hours, 13 minutes and 31 seconds, aboard the IDEC 3
Equator to Equator Record in 29 days, 9 hours, 10 minutes and 55 seconds, aboard the IDEC 3
Classic Yachts Circuit, aboard the S&S Sparkman & Stephens "Galvana" of The Pella Brothers
In 2017-18, he was a crewmember on leg 3 with Team AkzoNobel in the Volvo Ocean Race .

2016:
Jules Verne Trophy, record attempt, aboard the IDEC 3. Circumnavigation of the world in 47 days, 14 hours and 47 minutes
Substitute of the Vendée Globe, round-the-world, single-handed regatta, for the French skipper Kito de Pavant
IMOCA 60 Circuit
Abandon Transat Québec-Saint-Malo, capsized aboard the "MOD70 Musandam Oman-Sail"
Classic Yachts Circuit, aboard the S&S Sparkman & Stephens "Galvana" of The Pella Brothers

2015:
1st Sailing Arabia – The Tour, aboard the “EFG Bank (Monaco)” of Sidney Gavignet
Round Ireland Sailing Record in 40 hours, 51 minutes and 57 seconds, aboard the "MOD 70 Musandam-Oman Sail"
Indian Ocean Record in 6 days, 23 hours and 4 minutes, aboard the IDEC 3, between Cape Agulhas in South Africa (20°East) and South East Cape in Tasmania (146°49 East)

2014:
1st Route du Rhum, aboard the “Tales II”
Record Route du Rhum – Class40  in 16 days, 17 hours, 47 minutes and 8 seconds, aboard the “Tales II”
First and only Spanish to win a transoceanic single-handed regatta
Trophée Course Open UNCL (Union Nationale pour la Course au Large)
Class40 Circuit

2013:
Class40 Circuit
2nd Transat Jacques Vabre (Transoceanic double-handed regatta), aboard the “Tales II” of Gonzalo Botín
Oceanic Multihull Circuit
1st Around Europe, Route des Princes, aboard the Maxi-Trimaran, “Prince de Bretagne 80” of Lionel Lemonchois

2012:
IMOCA 60 Circuit
4th Around Europe, Europa Warm’UP, aboard the “Groupe Bel” of Kito de Pavant
Substitute of the Vendée Globe, round-the-world, single-handed regatta, for the French skipper Kito de Pavant
Skipper of the IMOCA 60 “DCNS” for the film “Turning Tide” (“En Solitaire”), with the famous French actor Fraçois Cluzet

2011:
IMOCA 60 Circuit
4th Barcelona World Race (round-the-world, double-handed regatta, 30.000 miles), aboard the “Estrella Damm”

2010:
IMOCA 60 Circuit
3rd Vuelta a España, with crew, aboard the “Estrella Damm”
Record New York – Barcelona in 12 days, 6 hours, 3 minutes and 48 seconds, aboard the “Estrella Damm”
1st Class40 World Championships, aboard the “TALES” of Gonzalo Botín

2009:
IMOCA 60 Circuit
4th Istanbul Europa Race, aboard the “Virbac Paprec” of Jean Pierre Dick
5th Transat Jacques Vabre (Transoceanic double-handed regatta), aboard the “W Hotels”

2008:
Class40 Circuit, double-handed, aboard the “Tales” of Gonzalo Botín
2nd Class40 World Championships

2007:
Record Denia - Ibiza in 5 hours, 38 minutes and 11 seconds, aboard the “Generalitat Valenciana”
Mini Transat 6.50 Circuit, single-handed, aboard the “Generalitat Valenciana”
Abandon Mini Transat 6.50 after dismasting near Cape Verde

2006:
Med Cup Circuit TP 52, aboard the “BRIBÓN”, skipped by S.M. Juan Carlos I
Mini Transat 6.50 Circuit, single-handed, aboard the “OpenSea”

2005:
2nd Mini Transat 6.50 (International Transoceanic single-handed regatta, 90 participants), aboard the “OpenSea-TeamWork”
First and only Spanish to win a leg of a transoceanic single-handed regatta
Mini Transat 6.50 aboard the “OpenSea”

2004:
IMS Circuit aboard the “Azur de Puig” skipped by S.A.R la Infanta Cristina
Mini Transat 6.50 Circuit aboard the “Open Sea”, double and single-handed
Preparation ORMA 60 “GITANA” Trimaran
Selected Best Spanish Sailor Year 2003

2003:
3rd Mini Transat 6.50 (International Transoceanic single-handed regatta, 90 participants) aboard the “Santiveri-Texknit”
First Spanish podium on a single-handed transoceanic regatta
Mini Transat 6.50 Circuit, aboard the “Sampaquita”

Awards
Juan Sebastian Elcano Award 2019
Selected Best Spanish Sailor Year 2014
Trophée Course Open UNCL (Union Nationale pour la Course au Large) Year 2014
Selected Best Spanish Sailor Year 2013
Selected Best Spanish Sailor Year 2003

Filmography
 2017: "Informe Robinson: La vuelta al mundo de Alex Pella"
 2014: "Esta es la victoria de todos" - Route du Rhum Documentary Alex Pella
 2013: Turning Tide (En solitaire) de Christophe Offenstein Making-of "Turning Tide" (En solitaire)

References

External links
 Official website of Alex Pella
 Official Facebook of Alex Pella
 Official Twitter of Alex Pella
 Profile of Alex Pella on the official website of the Route du Rhum

1972 births
Living people
Single-handed sailors
Spanish male sailors (sport)
Volvo Ocean Race sailors